Zverotić is a Montenegrin surname. Notable people with the surname include:

Anes Zverotić (born 1985), Montenegrin footballer
Elsad Zverotić (born 1986), Montenegrin footballer

Montenegrin surnames
Slavic-language surnames
Patronymic surnames